Robert Webber Monro (28 March 1838 – 10 June 1908) was an English first-class cricketer and barrister.

The son of John Boscawen Monro, he was born at Bloomsbury in March 1838. He was educated Harrow School, before going up to Balliol College, Oxford. While studying at Oxford, he made a single appearance in first-class cricket for Oxford University against Cambridge University in The University Match of 1860 at Lord's. Batting twice in the match, he was dismissed for 3 runs by Denzil Onslow in the Oxford first innings, while in their second innings he opened the batting and was dismissed without scoring by Robert Lang. Monro also played rackets for Oxford, pairing with William Hart Dyke against Cambridge in 1860, with the pair winning 4–2.

A student of Lincoln's Inn, he was called to the bar in January 1864. He was a clerk in the House of Lords from 1869 until 1901, before becoming chief clerk to the Parliament Office in the House of Lords from 1901 to 1903. Monro died in June 1908 at Coombe Wood, Surrey.

References

External links

1838 births
1908 deaths
People from Bloomsbury
People educated at Harrow School
Alumni of Balliol College, Oxford
English cricketers
Oxford University cricketers
Members of Lincoln's Inn
19th-century English lawyers